Black-capped babbler has been split into the following species:
 Javan black-capped babbler, Pellorneum capistratum
 Malayan black-capped babbler, Pellorneum nigrocapitatum
 Bornean black-capped babbler, Pellorneum capistratoides

Birds by common name